Body Glove is an American brand of watersports apparel and accessories that was founded in 1953 by twin brothers Bill and Bob Meistrell. The brothers are often credited with inventing the first practical wetsuit in the early 1950s at the back of their Redondo Beach, California surf shop, Dive N' Surf. From those wetsuits, Body Glove branched out into other product categories. They now make wetsuits, swimsuits, clothing, shoes, life vests, sunglasses, wakeboards, paddle boards, towables, backpacks, phone cases and snorkeling equipment.

History
Body Glove was started by identical twins Bill and Bob Meistrell in Redondo Beach, CA. They were raised in Boonville, Missouri and moved to Manhattan Beach, CA in 1944.  They were always interested in the water and even crafted a rudimentary scuba helmet out of an oil can, tar, glass and a bicycle pump so that they could explore a pond on their family farm. When they moved to Manhattan Beach, they fell even more in love with the water. They both were on their high school swim team and became interested in surfing and diving. They became certified Los Angeles County Lifeguards.

Bill and Bob borrowed $1800 from their mother and each bought one third of the local sports shop called Dive N' Surf, owned then by surfboard shaper Hap Jacobs and dive entrepreneur Bev Morgan. Because the water was cold in the winter, they needed to find a way to stay in the water longer. In 1953, Bill Meistrell went to Bedford, Virginia, where he found the insulation used in the back of refrigerators, neoprene, and the first practical wetsuit was born. The Meistrells designed and tailored their own brand of wetsuits. In the beginning, the wetsuits were named the Dive N Surf Thermocline. The Meistrells did not think this was a great name, so they hired a marketing consultant, Duke Boyd. He asked about the characteristics of the suits, and Bill said "They fit like a glove," so Boyd came up with the name Body Glove.

The business has stayed in the Meistrell family for three generations. There are five 2nd-generation Meistrells: Billy, Julie, Robbie, Ronnie and Randy. There are 13 3rd-generation Meistrells, two of whom still work for the company: Nick Meistrell and Jenna Meistrell. The company continues to make products for the active outdoor enthusiast.

Sponsorship
The company's pro surfers include:
 Tatiana Weston-Webb
 Mo Freitas
 Alex Gray
 Cheyne Magnusson

Past athletes include: Jamie O'Brien, Anthony Walsh, Nate Yeomans, Gabe Kling, Mike Losness, Holly Beck, Bruce Irons.

The company's pro wakeboarders include:
 Harley Clifford 
 Bob Soven 
 Rusty Malinoski
 Noah Flegel 
 Keenan Flegel
 Taylor Dorey

References

External links
 
 Body Glove Facebook page
 Body Glove Performance site

Companies based in Los Angeles County, California
Clothing companies established in 1953
1980s fashion
Surfwear brands
Redondo Beach, California
1953 establishments in California